Piazzale Roma is a square in Venice, Italy, at the entrance of the city, at the end of the Ponte della Libertà. Piazzale Roma and nearby Tronchetto island are the only places in Venice's insular urban core accessible to ground motor vehicles, such as automobiles and buses.

The square acts as the main bus station for Venice. There are bus links to Venice Marco Polo Airport and Treviso Airport. The square is close to the main Santa Lucia railway station for Venice, linked by the Ponte della Costituzione, a modern footbridge over the western end of the Grand Canal, installed in 2008. The Venice People Mover, a public transit system, connects Tronchetto island and Piazzale Roma. It started operating in 2010.

See also 
 Piazza San Marco, the main square in Venice

References 

Roma
Transport in Venice
Bus stations in Italy